Range Land is a 1949 American Western film directed by Lambert Hillyer and written by Adele Buffington. The film stars Whip Wilson, Andy Clyde, Reno Browne, Leonard Penn, Reed Howes and Kenne Duncan. The film was released on December 24, 1949, by Monogram Pictures.

Plot

Cast              
Whip Wilson as Whip Wilson
Andy Clyde as Winks Grayson
Reno Browne as Doris Allen
Leonard Penn as Bart Sheldon
Reed Howes as Red Davis
Kenne Duncan as Sheriff Winters
Steve Clark as Ben Allen
Kermit Maynard as Shad Cook 
Stanley Blystone as Matt Mosely 
John Cason as Rocky Rand 
Billy Griffith as Prof. Ambrose 
Michael Dugan as Guard
Carol Henry as Joe Evans

References

External links
 

1949 films
American Western (genre) films
1949 Western (genre) films
Monogram Pictures films
Films directed by Lambert Hillyer
American black-and-white films
1940s English-language films
1940s American films